Mirandea is a genus of flowering plants belonging to the family Acanthaceae.

It is native to Mexico.

The genus name of Mirandea is in honour of Faustino Miranda Gonzalez (1905–1964), a Spanish-born Mexican botanist. 
It was first described and published in Ciencia (Mexico) Vol.19 on page 80 in 1959.

Species
According to Kew:
Mirandea andradenia 
Mirandea grisea 
Mirandea huastecensis 
Mirandea hyssopus 
Mirandea nutans 
Mirandea sylvatica

References

Acanthaceae
Acanthaceae genera
Plants described in 1959
Flora of Mexico